Puerto Rico Highway 127 (PR-127) is a road that travels from Yauco, Puerto Rico to Peñuelas. This highway begins at its intersection with PR-121 and PR-128 in Susúa Baja and ends at its junction with PR-2 in Encarnación, passing through downtown Guayanilla.

Major intersections

See also

 List of highways numbered 127

References

External links
 

127